This article lists the main weightlifting events and their results for 2018.

World weightlifting championships
 July 7–14: 2018 World Junior Weightlifting Championships in  Tashkent
  won the gold medal tally.  won the overall medal tally.
 September 20–23: 2018 FISU World University Weightlifting Championships in  Biała Podlaska
 Both  and  won 3 gold medals and 8 overall medals each.
 November 1–10: 2018 World Weightlifting Championships in  Ashgabat
  won both the gold and overall medal tallies.

Continental and regional weightlifting championships
 March 23–30: 2018 African Junior & Youth Weightlifting Championships in  Cairo
 Junior:  won both the gold and overall medal tallies.
 Youth:  won both the gold and overall medal tallies.
 March 26 – April 1: 2018 European Weightlifting Championships in  Bucharest
  won the gold medal tally.  won the overall medal tally.
 April 20–30: 2018 Asian Junior & Youth Weightlifting Championships in  Urgench
 Junior:  won both the gold and overall medal tallies.
 Youth:  won both the gold and overall medal tallies.
 May 12–19: 2018 Pan American Weightlifting Championships in  Santo Domingo
 Men: Six national teams won 3 gold medals each.  won the overall medal tally.
 Women:  won both the gold and overall medal tallies.
 May 28–31: 2018 South American Weightlifting Championships in  Cochabamba (in conjunction with the 2018 South American Games)
  won both the gold and overall medal tallies.
 June 3–10: 2018 Pan American Youth Weightlifting Championships in  Palmira
  and  won 4 gold and 13 overall medals each.
 June 26–30: 2018 Oceania Senior, Junior, & Youth Weightlifting Championships in / Le Mont-Dore
 Senior:  won the gold medal tally.  and  won ten overall medals each.
 Junior:  won both the gold and overall medal tallies.
 Youth:  won the gold medal tally.  won the overall medal tally.
 July 22–29: 2018 European Youth Weightlifting Championships in  Milan
  won the gold medal tally.  won the overall medal tally.
 September 5–12: 2018 Pan American Junior Weightlifting Championships in  Manizales
  won both the gold and overall medal tallies.
 October 20–27: 2018 European Junior Weightlifting Championships in  Zamość
 Note: This event was scheduled for A Coruña, but the EWF took away the event because of politics.
 Men:  won the gold medal tally.  won the overall medal tally.
 Women:  and  won 5 gold medals each. Turkey won the overall medal tally.

References

External links
 International Weightlifting Federation Website

 
Weightlifting by year
2018 sport-related lists